Jayshri Jadhav is an Indian politician and widow of Chandrakant Jadhav who is serving as Member of 14th Maharashtra Legislative Assembly from Kolhapur North Assembly constituency. She is the first woman since independence who was elected as MLA from Kolhapur.

References 

Maharashtra MLAs 2019–2024

Year of birth missing (living people)
Living people